Jazovka is a pit in the Žumberak Mountains area of Croatia, known as a site of mass executions and burials associated with Partisan activities during and after World War II. Hundreds of wounded Croatian soldiers from Zagreb hospitals and civilians were dumped in the pit. Some were already dead, but others died of exposure and injuries. Since the site was rediscovered in 1990, when more 800 skeletons were found, an annual pilgrimage has been organized.

History
The first victims are believed to have been soldiers of the fascist puppet state Independent State of Croatia, captured by Partisan forces after a battle near Krašić in January 1943. Some were likely shot before being dumped into the pit; others might have been thrown in alive.

Later in 1945 the Partisans used the pit to dispose secretly of bodies of prisoners of war following the Bleiburg repatriations. They also dumped wounded Croatian soldiers, medical staff, and Catholic nuns. 

While local people retained the memory of these events, the communist government suppressed any acknowledgement of these wartime murders by the Partisans. In 1990, after the fall of socialism in Croatia, the pit was rediscovered.

Since this period, the Catholic Church in Croatia has organised an annual pilgrimage to the site. It is held on June 22 and coincides with Anti-Fascist Struggle Day. The Church has lined the path to the pit from a nearby village with images of stations of the cross. The event is reported as popular among members of fringe right-wing groups in Croatia.

Notable victims 
 Gaudencija Šplajt, Roman Catholic nun who was sentenced to execution by shooting by the Partisan military court in Zagreb on 29 June 1945. She was convicted of aiding, harboring, and hiding a German bandit, the notorious Ustaša police director Ivan Tolj, and other Ustaše after the Soviet forces' and Partisans' liberation of Zagreb.

References

Caves of Croatia
Mass graves
20th century in Croatia
Aftermath of World War II in Yugoslavia
Political repression in Communist Yugoslavia